The names CB25 or CB-25 can have different meanings:

 CB-25, a cannabinoid receptor antagonist
 CB25, a CB postcode area district